The Speaker of the Yukon Legislative Assembly is the presiding officer of that legislature. Although the Yukon Territorial Council was first established by the confederation of the Yukon in 1898, it was not an elected body until 1909, when the position of Commissioner was turned into the Speaker of the Assembly. On December 13, 1974, the territorial council renamed itself to the Yukon Legislative Assembly.

References

Yukon
Politics of Yukon